Pedro II, Piauí is a municipality in the state of Piauí in the Northeast region of Brazil.

The municipality contains part of the  Serra da Ibiapaba Environmental Protection Area, created in 1996.

See also
List of municipalities in Piauí

Pedro II (Pedro Segundo), named after Brazil's last Emperor. The city has the only mined opal deposit in South America. A mine in Peru closed a few years ago. Opals were discovered here in 1930 by a man who was washing a cassava for his lunch. The strange stone was sent to Teresina where it was identified as an opal.

References

Municipalities in Piauí